The IAR 47 was a 1942 prototype aircraft built by Industria Aeronautică Română.

Development
In 1941, it became apparent that the then current Romanian reconnaissance type, the IAR 39, was no longer an effective design. Therefore, IAR designed a replacement type, the IAR-47. Effectively a hybrid of the IAR 39 and IAR 80, it used their IAR 14K IV C32 engine.
The IAR 47 prototype was flown for the first time in 1942 to meet a requirement for a tactical bombing and reconnaissance aircraft.

The aircraft was similar to the IAR 39, except for the fact that it was a low-wing monoplane and had a smaller cockpit (for 2 instead of 3).
Its fuselage, based on the IAR 39, was of mixed construction. Compared to the IAR 39, the observers fuselage side windows were deleted, and the crew reduced to two, pilot and observer/rear gunner, armed with a 7.92mm Rheinmetall MG.
Like the IAR 80, the IAR 47 was a low-winged monoplane, and used a re-enforced version of that type's undercarriage. Two 7.92mm Rheinmetall MGs were mounted, and six 110 lb (50 kg) bombs could be carried in a bomb bay between the crew's positions.
Reconnaissance was its primary mission, however, and the bomb bay was normally filled with a fuel tank, increasing its normal fuel load of 127 Imp gal (580 L) to 209 Imp gal (950 L).
The mission fit was three cameras, one vertical and two 45° oblique, in the fuselage underside.
The unarmed prototype was flight tested in autumn 1942, and exhibited good handling characteristics. However, in the light of the improved Soviet fighters now in service, its low powered engine, and light armament, it was considered obsolescent, and anyway, all of IAR's production capacity was required for Bf 109 production.
Therefore, development of the IAR 47 was stopped in January 1943, one  prototype being destroyed in a USAAF air raid in 1944.

Variants
There were (at least) two I.A.R. 47 prototypes. 
The first one (with partially glazed side and bottom fuselage) appears in the  colour photos, while the other one( YR-IGR), which resembles more the I.A.R. 80 fitted with long span wings, did not have side and bottom fuselage windows and  appears in the  1952 photos

Operators
 Kingdom of Romania
Royal Romanian Air Force

Romanian Air Force

Specifications (IAR 47)

See also

Notes

References
 The Illustrated Encyclopedia of Aircraft (Part Work 1982-1985), 1985, Orbis Publishing, Page 2192
 Axworthy, Max. "On Three Fronts: Romania's Aircraft Industry During World War Two". Air Enthusiast,   No.56, Winter 1994. Stamford, Lincs, UK:Key Publishing. ISSN 0143-5450. pp. 8–27.
 Morosanu, Teodor Liviu. "Romanian Reconnaissance". Air International, April 1994, Vol 46 No 4. Stamford, Lincs, UK:Key Publishing. ISSN 0306-5634. pp. 207–211.

1940s Romanian military reconnaissance aircraft
1940s Romanian bomber aircraft
World War II Romanian reconnaissance aircraft
Low-wing aircraft
Aircraft first flown in 1942
47